The NOAA Corps Achievement Medal is an honorary recognition awarded to members of the NOAA Commissioned Officer Corps or to members of the Uniformed Services detailed, assigned, or attached to NOAA.

Award criteria
The NOAA Corps Achievement Medal is awarded for achievement of a professional or leadership nature based on sustained performance or specific 
achievement of a superlative nature. The recognized service should be of such merit as to warrant greater recognition than award of the NOAA Corps Director's Ribbon, but less than what would warrant the NOAA Corps Commendation Medal or a higher award.

Appearance
Subsequent awards are denoted by a gold 5/16 inch star worn on the medal suspension ribbon and service ribbon.

References

Awards and decorations of the National Oceanic and Atmospheric Administration